Sarah Pinborough is an English author who has written YA and adult thriller, fantasy and cross-genre novels. She has also been a screenwriter in adaptations of her novels for TV as well as in original projects.

Bibliography

Novels
She has had more than 20 novels published by several companies and in several countries.  They have also been translated into a number of languages.

Leisure Books
Her work has been published within the horror books section of Leisure Books.
 The Hidden (2004, Leisure Books)  — amnesia is the start of a new life with hidden horrors 
 The Reckoning (2005, Leisure Books)  — horrors from teenage years come back to a group of adult friends
 Breeding Ground (2006, Leisure Books)  — end-of-the world novel where most of the population is wiped out by giant spiders born of human women
 The Taken (2007, Leisure Books)  — ghostly revenge novel
 Tower Hill (2008, Leisure Books)  — about a small town in America in supernatural peril of Biblical proportions
 Feeding Ground (2009, Leisure Books)  — sequel to Breeding Ground; Pinborough's original proposal for this sequel would have been called The Brethren but this was rejected by the publisher as being too much like science fiction for their list. The book as written is intended to be like a "creature feature" movie.

Torchwood

Torchwood is a spin-off series from the BBC series Doctor Who. These are TV tie-in novels and short stories in that shared world.
 Into the Silence (Torchwood) (2009, Random House) 
 The story Kaleidoscope in Consequences (Torchwood) (2009, Random House) 
 Torchwood: Long Time Dead (2011, Random House) 
Pinborough has also written short stories for the Torchwood Magazine. These are:
 Happy New Year Issue 20
 Mend Me Issue 23

The Dog-Faced Gods series
Now called the Forgotten Gods Trilogy in the Ace Books reprint.

"The 'Dog Faced Gods' series is set in an alternative world. The Britain of this world isn't a dystopia but it is merely a little crappier and harsher than ours." Jim Steel

A Matter of Blood (2010, Gollancz Books) (2013 Ace Books) 
The Shadow of the Soul (2011, Gollancz Books) (2013 Ace Books) 
The Chosen Seed (2012, Gollancz Books) (2013 Ace Books)

The Fairy Tale Series
Modern retellings of fairy stories published by Gollancz Books.
 Poison (April 2013 Gollancz Books)  — a modern  Snow White story
 Charm (July 2013 Gollancz Books)  — a modern Cinderella story
 Beauty (October 2013 Gollancz Books)  — a modern Sleeping Beauty story

Other novels

 The Language of Dying (2009, PS Publishing) (2013, Jo Fletcher Books)  — a dysfunctional family is revealed around the father's death-bed 
 Mayhem (2013, Jo Fletcher Books)  — a supernatural murder mystery set in Victorian London and based around the events of the Thames Torso Murders.
 Murder (2013, Jo Fletcher Books)  — a sequel to Mayhem
 The Death House (2015, Gollancz)  — bleak lives of children with a 'Defective gene'

 13 Minutes (2016, Flatiron Books)  — 'young adult' thriller following a girl being rescued from an icy river 
 Behind Her Eyes (2017, HarperCollins)  — an idyllic life suddenly changes and who can be trusted?
Cross Her Heart (2018, William Morrow & Co)  — psychological thriller about a liar and truth
Dead To Her (2020, HarperCollins)  — crime thriller involving an outsider marrying into elite society
Insomnia (2022, William Morrow & Co)  — psychological thriller about a successful lawyer approaching her 40th birthday

As Sarah Silverwood
As Sarah Silverwood, Sarah Pinborough writes fantasy fiction for the young adult fiction market.

The Nowhere Chronicles
This trilogy about teenagers set in a parallel, magical London, has been criticised for relying on a series of stereotypes.

The Double-edged Sword (2010, Gollancz) 
The Traitor's Gate (2011, Gollancz) 
The London Stone (2012, Gollancz)

Short stories

 Waiting For October (2007, Dark Arts Books) – a book of the combined short stories of Sarah Pinborough, Adam Pepper, Jeff Strand and Jeffrey Thomas (writer) 
 Hellbound Hearts (2009, Pocket Books) edited by Paul Kane (writer) and Marie O'Regan – Pinborough contributed "The Confessor's Tale" 
 Zombie Apocalypse! edited by Stephen Jones (author) (2010, Running Press) – Pinborough contributed "Diary Entry #1", "Diary Entry #2" and "Diary Entry #3" 
 The Compartments of Hell written with Paul Meloy in Black Static. A post apocalypse story where the only survivors are those who are high on opiates.
 The Room Upstairs in House of Fear, an anthology of Haunted House stories edited by Jonathan Oliver (publishing), (2011 Solaris Books)

Screenwriting
Pinborough has written for the BBC and several other television companies. These include treatments that have been aired and others still in long-term development.
 
Pinborough wrote Old School Ties, the second episode of the ninth series of the BBC TV crime drama New Tricks in 2012.

The following are at various stages of development: 
 M (2013) World Productions/ITV Global Returnable Drama Series.
Fallow Ground (2012) World Productions Original 3-part drama.
Red Summer (2012) Blind Monkey Pictures Feature screenplay. Under option.

Adaptations
Several of her novels have been optioned or adapted for TV or film. This includes:

In 2012, it was announced that director Peter Medak had been attached to direct Cracked, a screenplay based on Pinborough's first novel The Hidden but it has not been aired.
The Forgotten Gods/Dog-Faced Gods Trilogy was optioned for a television series in 2014 but has not been aired.
Her teenage thriller, 13 Minutes was bought by Netflix in 2016, with Josh Schwartz and Stephanie Savage writing the adaptation.
Netflix developed a limited series based on Pinborough's psychological thriller novel Behind Her Eyes. The series premiered on 17 February 2021.

Personal life
Pinborough was born in 1972 in Buckinghamshire, UK.

She is a patron of the Educational Wealth Fund.

References

External links
 
 
 Story Behind The Language of Dying – Essay by Sarah Pinborough
 Story Behind Murder – Essay by Sarah Pinborough
 Interview at Gothic Imagination

21st-century British novelists
21st-century British women writers
English horror writers
English television writers
English screenwriters
People from Milton Keynes
1972 births
Living people
British women novelists
British women television writers